Albert Michiels can refer to:

 Albert Michiels (footballer)
 Albert Michiels (wrestler)